A viewfinder is a device used in photography. Viewfinder may also refer to:

Viewfinder (album), a 2001 album by the group Pullman
Viewfinder (short story), a 1978 short story by Raymond Carver
Viewfinder (Transformers), a fictional character in the Transformers universe